Linear Variation series: Untitled is a painting by Yvonne Pickering Carter. It is in the collection of the North Carolina Museum of Art in Raleigh, North Carolina in the United States.

The painting comprises a series of abstract watercolor paint strokes on a piece of hand cut white paper. Carter's signature is located on the lower right of the front of the painting: Yvonne Pickering Carter '75.

Linear Variation series: Untitled was purchased by the North Carolina Museum of Art in 1975 with funding from the National Endowment for the Arts and the North Carolina State Art Society.

References

1975 paintings
Paintings by Yvonne Pickering Carter